Disappointment Mountain, also sometimes called Disappointment Hill, is a peak in northeastern Minnesota.  It is located about a mile east of the lake which shares its name.

References

Landforms of Lake County, Minnesota
Mountains of Minnesota